Adam Weissman is an American television director.

Career
Weissman is from New York City, beginning his career as a production assistant in the 1980s before directing television commercials. 

In 1990, Weissman wrote, produced, directed and financed a short film entitled The Norton Project, winning awards from the Chicago Film Festival and The International Film and TV Festival of NY and the CINE Competition. He then relocated to Los Angeles directing episodes for numerous Nickelodeon series in the 1990s namely Welcome Freshmen, My Brother and Me, Space Cases, The Mystery Files of Shelby Woo and Are You Afraid of the Dark?. Weissman then temporarily relocated to Canada directing episodes of Zixx, Vampire High, Fries with That?, Billable Hours and Tales from the Neverending Story.

Weissman continues to direct for both American and Canadian television shows for both channels, Nickelodeon and Disney Channel, including shows such as: True Jackson, VP, Drake & Josh, iCarly, Ned's Declassified School Survival Guide, Wendell & Vinnie, Good Luck Charlie, Hannah Montana, Zoey 101, Victorious, Sam & Cat, Henry Danger, Game Shakers, The Troop, Infected, Mr. Young, Cartoon Gene, A.N.T. Farm, Pair of Kings, Austin & Ally, Liv and Maddie, Mighty Med, Cousins for Life, Danger Force and Side Hustle.

References

External links

American expatriates in Canada
American television directors
Artists from New York City
Living people
Year of birth missing (living people)